'The Ireland Wolves team toured Bangladesh in October 2017 to play one first-class match and five limited overs matches against the Bangladesh A team.

Squads

Mehidy Hasan replaced Saif Hassan following the former's injury during the fielding session.

First-class match

Only Unofficial Test

List A series

1st Unofficial ODI

2nd Unofficial ODI

3rd Unofficial ODI

4th Unofficial ODI

5th Unofficial ODI

References 

A team cricket
2017 in Irish cricket